Legend of Illusion Starring Mickey Mouse is a 1995 platform video game. It was released for the Game Gear in 1995, with a Master System version released in Brazil at the end of 1998.

Plot
A dark shadow has struck the land and King Pete is told by the advisor that only a king can find the legendary water of life to heal the land. The cowardly Pete makes Mickey, a laundry boy, an honorary king. Reluctant at first, Mickey sets off to save the kingdom.

Gameplay
Unlike the other two Master System/Game Gear Illusion games, Mickey defeats enemies by throwing bars of soap (and later rocks) to defeat them rather than by bouncing on them. Frequently there are puzzles that need to be solved to progress through the stages. One of the stages is a scrolling shooter. If all gems are collected in the final level, the player is rewarded with an alternate ending after King Pete is defeated.

Reception

Reviewing the Game Gear version, GamePro mildly criticized the sounds, the lack of challenge, and the Game Gear's limited controls, but praised the "Disney quality" graphics and concluded the game to be "worth playing". The four reviewers of Electronic Gaming Monthly gave it a 7.5 out of 10, commenting on the impressive graphics (particularly the "crisp" colors), the solid controls and playability, and general fun of the game. Ed Semrad concluded, "It seems that the programmers took some time on this one. Action gamers and Disney fans alike should check out this outstanding game."

See also
List of Disney video games
List of Sega video game franchises

Notes

References

External links

1995 video games
Disney video games
Fantasy video games
Sega video games
Mickey Mouse video games
Donald Duck video games
Master System games
Game Gear games
Platform games
Side-scrolling video games
Video games with alternate endings
Video games developed in Japan
Single-player video games